Serine/threonine-protein kinase PRKY is an enzyme that in humans is encoded by the PRKY gene.

This gene encodes a member of the cAMP-dependent serine/threonine protein kinase family. This gene is located on chromosome Y, near the boundary of the pseudoautosomal region. Abnormal recombination between this gene and a related gene on chromosome X is a frequent cause of XX males and XY females.

References

Further reading

EC 2.7.11